Francis "Frank" Bowen (19 Sep 1896 – ) was an English professional rugby league footballer who played in the 1920s and 1930s.

Background
Frank Bowen's birth was registered in Prescot district, Lancashire, England, he was the Landlord of the Vine Tavern in Thatto Heath, coaching its successful amateur rugby league team after World War II, and he died aged .

Playing career

International honours
Frank Bowen won caps for Great Britain while at St. Helens Recs in 1928 against New Zealand (3 matches).

County honours
Frank Bowen represented Lancashire while at St. Helens Recs in 1922 against Australia at Goodison Park, Liverpool.

County Cup Final appearances
Frank Bowen did not play in St. Helens Recs' 17-0 victory over Swinton in the 1923–24 Lancashire County Cup Final during the 1923–24 season at Central Park, Wigan on Saturday 24 November 1923, in front of a crowd of 25,656, he did not play in the 0-10 defeat by Oldham in the 1924–25 Lancashire County Cup Final during the 1924–25 season at The Willows, Salford on Saturday 22 November 1924, in front of a crowd of 15,000, but he played right-, i.e. number 10, in the 18-3 victory over Wigan in the 1930–31 Lancashire County Cup Final during the 1930–31 season at Station Road, Swinton on Saturday 29 November 1930, in front of a crowd on 16,710.

Testimonial match
Frank Bowen's Testimonial match for St. Helens Recs took place against a Jim Sullivan Select XIII in 1931.

Genealogical information

References

External links
!Great Britain Statistics at englandrl.co.uk (statistics currently missing due to not having appeared for both Great Britain, and England)
Profile at saints.org.uk

1896 births
1964 deaths
English rugby league players
Great Britain national rugby league team players
Lancashire rugby league team players
Place of death missing
Rugby league props
Rugby league second-rows
Rugby league players from St Helens, Merseyside
St Helens Recreation RLFC players
St Helens R.F.C. players